The Kampar District (Kinta South) is a district in Perak, Malaysia. It was a district on 21 May 2009 after the Sultan of Perak declared Kampar the state's 10th district, which is the smaller district in the state. Its local government is Kampar District Council based in the town of Kampar.

Historically, Kampar District was once famous for its tin, being one of the major tin producers in the 18th century. In the 19th century, Kinta district was famous for its tin. It was the number one tin producing valley in the world.

Administrative divisions

Kampar District is divided into 2 mukims, which are:
 Kampar
 Teja

Demographics 

The following is based on Department of Statistics Malaysia 2010 census.

Federal Parliament and State Assembly Seats 

Kampar district is divided between two parliamentary seats with some areas of the district in Gopeng constituency and the rest of the district into Kampar constituency.

List of Kampar district representatives in the Federal Parliament (Dewan Rakyat)

List of Kampar district representatives in the State Legislative Assembly of Perak

See also

 Districts of Malaysia

References